Jeon Ok-ja (born 13 April 1948) is a South Korean former swimmer. She competed in the women's 100 metre backstroke at the 1964 Summer Olympics.

References

External links
 

1948 births
Living people
South Korean female backstroke swimmers
Olympic swimmers of South Korea
Swimmers at the 1964 Summer Olympics
Place of birth missing (living people)